Children of the Dust may refer to:

Children of the Dust (novel), a 1985 novel by Louise Lawrence
Children of the Dust, a 1995 novel by Clancy Carlile
Children of the Dust (miniseries), a 1995 U.S. TV miniseries
Children of Dust (film), a 1923 film directed by Frank Borzage